Dorian Gray syndrome (DGS) denotes a cultural and societal phenomenon characterized by a man's extreme pride in his personal appearance and the fitness of his physique, which is accompanied by difficulties in coping with the requirements of psychological maturation and with the aging of his body.

The DGS is characterized by a triad of symptoms that overlap, and so combine diagnostic signs of dysmorphophobia, narcissistic character traits, and the immaturity of arrested development, which often are found in paraphilias.

Associated with consumption of cosmetic products and services, hair-restoration procedures, anti-impotence drugs, and cosmetic surgery. The term "Dorian Gray syndrome" refers to the protagonist of the novel The Picture of Dorian Gray (1891), an exceptionally handsome man whose hedonism and excessive self-love proved detrimental to the personal, social, and emotional aspects of his life, and who sought to escape the ravages of time and his own decadent lifestyle by having a supernatural portrait of himself age in his place.

History

The DGS was first described in The Dorian Gray Syndrome: Psychodynamic Need for Hair growth Restorers and other "fountains of youth" (2001), in a symposium about the unrealistic male pursuit of bodily perfection — by means of lifestyle-enhancing drugs, aesthetic surgery, and psychotropic medicines — and its consequences for his mental health as a social being.

The culturally descriptive name of the syndrome refers to the eponymous protagonist of the novel The Picture of Dorian Gray (1891), by Oscar Wilde, the story of a very handsome young man who much admires and envies the just-completed portrait of himself, and wishes that it would grow old, rather than he. In order to resist the physical corruptions of time and nature, and unable and unwilling to mature, Dorian Gray "gives his soul away", and his wish is granted.

The oil portrait and the narrative of the novel transgress and cite narcissistic mirror motives; as such, eternal beauty, aging, and maturation are represented with the psychological dyad of "the person and the mirror". The personal character of the man Dorian Gray is the background for the clinical description of the Dorian Gray syndrome that affects the patient.

Causes
The Dorian Gray syndrome arises from the concurring and overlapping clinical concepts of the narcissistic personality, dysmorphophobia, and paraphilia. Psychodynamically, the man with DGS presents an interplay among his narcissistic tendencies ("timeless beauty"), his arrested development (inability to psychologically mature), and his use of "medical lifestyle" products and services — hair restoration, drugs (for impotence, weight-loss, and mood modification), laser dermatology, and plastic surgery — in order to remain young.

Although the DGS patient displays diagnostic features of said mental disorders, the syndrome describes a common, underlying psychodynamics of mental illness, which is characterized by narcissistic defences against time-dependent maturation, expressed by actively seeking the timeless beauty of youth. The article Das Dorian Gray syndrom (2005) reported that approximately 3.0 per cent of the population of Germany present features of the Dorian Gray syndrome.

Diagnosis
The diagnostic criteria for Dorian Gray syndrome are:
 Signs of dysmorphophobia
 Arrested development (inability to mature)
 Using at least two different medical-lifestyle products and services:
 Hair-growth restoration (e.g. finasteride)
 Antiadiposita to lose weight (e.g. orlistat)
 Anti-impotence drugs  (e.g. sildenafil)
 Anti-depressant drugs (e.g. fluoxetine)
 Cosmetic dermatology (e.g. laser resurfacing)
 Cosmetic surgery (e.g. a face-lift, liposuction)

Sequelae
Episodes of major depressive disorder and of suicidal crisis occur in the man with Dorian Gray syndrome when the defense mechanism activities, the pursuit of eternal youth, fail to indefinitely preserve his handsome face and sculpted physique; usually, anti-depressant drugs and psychotherapy are prescribed and applied to counter his feelings of failure.

Furthermore, if the man misunderstands the self-defensive character of "acting out" the DGS, and continues pursuing the timeless beauty of male youth, without being aware of the psychodynamics of narcissism, then he, as a psychiatric patient, establishes a cycle of chronic psychological depression. In extreme cases of DGS, the man seeks self-destruction, by means either of drugs or with plastic surgery, or both, in order to fill the narcissistic emptiness that is the Dorian Gray syndrome.

Analogous applications
 In sport, the Dorian Gray syndrome is applied to aging baseball players who retain their competitive edge (athleticism) with drugs that are illegal in professional sport.
 In architecture, the Dorian Gray syndrome is applied to the rehabilitation of a building to a pristine condition greater than when the building was new.

See also 
 Body modification
 Fountain of Youth
Peter Pan syndrome

References

Further reading
 Brosig B.(2000) The "Dorian Gray Syndrome" and other fountains of youth. Paper presented at the Continuous Medical Education Board of the  Landesärztekammer Hessen, Clinical Pharmacology Section, on 29. 4. 2000 in Bad Nauheim, FRG.
 Brosig B, Kupfer J, Niemeier V, Gieler U. The "Dorian Gray Syndrome": psychodynamic need for hair growth restorers and other "fountains of youth." Int J Clin Pharmacol Ther. 2001 Jul;39(7):279-83. .
 Brosig, B., Euler, S., Brähler, E., Gieler, U. (2005) Das Dorian Gray Syndrom. In: Trüeb, R. A. (Hg.) : Smart aging. Darmstadt, Steinkopff (in press).
 Euler, S., Brähler, E., Brosig, B. (2003): Das Dorian-Gray-Syndrom als „ethnische Störung“ der Spätmoderne. Psychosozial 26, 73–89.

External links
 The “Dorian Gray Syndrome” (English)

Body shape
Culture-bound syndromes
Immortality
Narcissism
Phobias
The Picture of Dorian Gray